Devices and Desires is a 1989 detective novel in the Adam Dalgliesh series by P. D. James. It takes place on Larksoken, a fictional isolated headland in Norfolk. The title comes from the service of Morning Prayer in the 1662 Book of Common Prayer: "We have followed too much the devices and desires of our own hearts".

Plot overview

Commander Adam Dalgliesh, having published his second volume of poetry, retreats to the remote Larksoken headland where his recently deceased aunt, Jane Dalgliesh, has left him a converted windmill. However, a psychopathic serial killer, known as the Norfolk Whistler, is on the loose and seems to have arrived at Larksoken when Dalgliesh finds the body of the nearby nuclear power plant's Acting Administrative Officer during an evening stroll on the beach.

Major themes
The book deals at length with such issues as nuclear power and its dangers/benefits; the loss of a wife and the effect it has on a family; the bond of siblings; the use and manifestations of both psychosis and duty; and, finally, the love among family members. The book is also notable in that Dalgliesh himself does not actually solve the crime; the book instead begins with different characters carrying on their lives with the bleak backdrop of a controversial power station and a prowling serial killer. Soon, however, after the copycat murder that propels the book along, we watch the characters interact, react, and strike out at one another, although very little actual detecting takes place.

Reception
In a 1990 book review for The New York Times, Judith Crist wrote "Her newest mystery, 'Devices and Desires,' is P. D. James at better than her best... She has not failed us, and she has exceeded herself."

Adaptations
A television version of the novel was produced for Britain's ITV network in 1991. It starred Roy Marsden as Adam Dalgliesh.

References

External links

1989 British novels
Novels by P. D. James
Novels set in Norfolk
Novels about serial killers
Novels about writers
Faber and Faber books
British detective novels